OAHP is the Office of Archaeology and Historic Preservation and may be:

 Colorado Office of Archaeology and Historic Preservation
 Washington State Department of Archaeology and Historic Preservation